Beth P. Turner (born May 13, 1958 in Maine) is an American politician who served as a member of the Maine House of Representatives for the 141st district from 2011 to 2018. She was first elected on March 1, 2011, in a special election following the death of Rep. Everett McLeod in December 2010.

Turner served on the MSAD 31 School Board and the Select Board in her hometown of Burlington, Maine prior to her election the House of Representatives.

References

1958 births
Living people
People from Penobscot County, Maine
Republican Party members of the Maine House of Representatives
Maine city council members
School board members in Maine
Women state legislators in Maine
Women city councillors in Maine
21st-century American politicians
21st-century American women politicians